Burundi Sport Dynamik New Look or simply Sports Dynamic is a football (soccer) club from Burundi based in Bujumbura. Their home venue is 10,000 capacity Prince Louis Rwagasore Stadium.

In 1972 the team won the Burundi Premier League.

Squad

Honours
Burundi Premier League:1965, 1966, 1967, 1968, 1982, 1995, 1997

Performance in CAF competitions
CAF Champions League: 1 appearance
1973 African Cup of Champions Clubs – First Round

References

External links

Football clubs in Burundi
Bujumbura